The Gulf Volleyball Clubs Champions Championship for 2005 was won by Al-Muharraq SC.

League standings

Source: koora.com (Arabic)

Qatar SC and Al-Muharraq SC played an extra final match, which Al-Muharraq SC won 3-1 to take the championship.

References

GCC Volleyball Club Championship